Milen Velev (born 4 September 1971) is a former professional tennis player from Bulgaria.

Career
Velev appeared in 20 Davis Cup ties for Bulgaria, from 1988 to 2002. He was victorious in 20 of his 34 rubbers, finishing with a 14/7 record in singles and 6/7 in doubles. Only Todor Enev has won more Davis Cup matches for the national team. He had his best win in 1993, when he defeated top 30 player Marcos Ondruska, a South African.

He was a quarter-finalist at the 1992 Saab International, an ATP Tour tournament held in Athens. En route he upset fifth seed Guillermo Pérez Roldán.

The Bulgarian played in the main draw of one Grand Slam event during his career, the 1994 Australian Open. He met veteran Mats Wilander in his opening round match, which he lost in four sets.

Year-end rankings

Challenger and Futures Finals

Singles: 7 (4–3)

Doubles: 8 (5–3)

Davis Cup 
Milen Velev debuted for the Bulgaria Davis Cup team in 1988. Since then he has 16 nominations with 20 ties played, his singles W/L record is 14–7 and doubles W/L record is 6–7 (20–14 overall).

Singles (14–7)

Doubles (6–7) 

 RPO = Relegation Play–off
 RR = Round Robin

References

External links
 
 
 

1971 births
Living people
Bulgarian male tennis players
Sportspeople from Sofia